Raymond Apple   (born 27 December 1935) is an emeritus senior rabbi. He was the Senior Rabbi of the Great Synagogue of Sydney between 1972 and 2005. In this role, he was one of Australia's highest profile rabbis and the leading spokesman for Judaism in Australia.

Early life
Born in Melbourne, Apple was educated at the selective Melbourne High School. His rebbe was Dr Samuel Billigheimer (1889-1983). He continued his education at the University of Melbourne, where he graduated Bachelor of Arts and Bachelor of Laws, then at the University of New England in Australia, gaining a Master of Literature degree, and finally at the Jews' College, now called the London School of Jewish Studies, where he received a teaching diploma and a semikhah, or rabbinic diploma.

Apple has received a Doctor of Laws (LL.D.) honoris causa from the University of New South Wales and Doctor of the University (D.Univ.) from the Australian Catholic University.

Apple is also an Honorary Fellow of the University of Sydney and recipient of the Distinguished Alumni award of the University of New England.

Religious leadership
Between 1960 and 1972  Apple served London congregations at Bayswater and Hampstead before returning to Australia to take up the role of senior rabbi at the Great Synagogue in Sydney.

In Sydney he also served as a dayan (rabbinic judge) and registrar for the Sydney Beth Din.

Interfaith dialogue has been a lifetime interest of Apple and one which he pursued in Australia. He is a patron and a former joint president and chairman of the Australian Council of Christians and Jews and also a life member and former chairman of the New South Wales Council. He founded the Christian-Jewish Luncheon Club in Sydney, and has been a leader of dialogue with Islam.

Other roles
Apple was an Australian Army Reserve chaplain for fifteen years, and in 1988-2006 senior rabbi to the Australian Defence Force. He also served, for two terms, as chairman of the Religious Advisory Committee to the Services, the first Jewish representative to hold this office. He was awarded the Reserve Force Decoration and the Australian Defence Medal. He was also a chaplain to the NSW Police.

Apple is prominent in Freemasonry, being a Past Deputy Grand Master, Past Junior Grand Warden, and Past Grand Chaplain of the United Grand Lodge of New South Wales and the Australian Capital Territory.

Retirement
Apple retired from his Sydney position in 2005, made aliyah in 2006, and has lived in Israel since then.

While based in Jerusalem, Apple served as president of the Israel Regional section of the Rabbinical Council of America between 2016 and 2018.

Honours

Apple is an Officer of the Order of Australia for his services to the community, as well as holding the Queen's Silver Jubilee Medal and the Centenary of Federation Medal.

He has received the honorary degrees of Doctor of Laws from the University of New South Wales and Doctor of the University from the Australian Catholic University (2016). He is also an Honorary Fellow of the University of Sydney and has received a Distinguished Alumni award from the University of New England.

Selected publications

Apple has written a number of books, including:
 
 
  
  
 
 
 
 
 
 

 
 

He has also published numerous articles on Jews, Jewish history, the Jews in Australia, and various Jewish and interfaith themes. He is the author of "OzTorah", a weekly e-mail service and website presenting insights into the Torah reading, an Ask the Rabbi forum, and articles on Freemasonry, interfaith issues, British Jewish history, and the Australian Jewish community and its history. The OzTorah archives are available on his website at http://www.oztorah.com

References

External links 
 The Hampstead Synagogue
 The Great Synagogue, Sydney
 OzTorah

1935 births
Living people
20th-century Australian rabbis
21st-century Australian rabbis
Alumni of the London School of Jewish Studies
Australian Army chaplains
Australian emigrants to Israel
Australian Freemasons
Australian military chaplains
Australian Orthodox rabbis
20th-century English rabbis
Melbourne Law School alumni
Modern Orthodox rabbis
Officers of the Order of Australia
People educated at Melbourne High School
Rabbis in the military
Religious leaders from Melbourne
Religious Zionist Orthodox rabbis